Admiral of the Fleet Wasantha Kumar Jayadeva Karannagoda RSP, VSV, USP, MBA, MSc, ndc, psc, DISS, MRIN, MNI, SLN (born November 22, 1952) was the Commander of the Sri Lankan Navy and former Sri Lankan Ambassador to Japan. Before serving as the Commander of the Navy he commanded four Operational Naval Commands on seven occasions. He has the distinction of being the only officer to be considered to the highest seating of the Commander of the Navy straight from a Naval Area Command.

On 9 December 2021, he was appointed as the Governor of the North-Western Province.

See also 
Sarath Fonseka
Roshan Goonetileke
List of Sri Lankan non-career diplomats
List of Sri Lankan non-career Permanent Secretaries

References

Living people
Sri Lankan admirals of the fleet
Sinhalese military personnel
Alumni of Ananda College
Ambassadors of Sri Lanka to Japan
Commanders of the Navy (Sri Lanka)
Naval and Maritime Academy graduates
1952 births